Chernovite may refer to:

 Chernovite-(Y), a mineral
 Chernovite-(Ce), a mineral
 Chernovite (hacking group), credited as authors of the software toolkit Pipedream